The Impulse 21, also called the Impulse Eagle, is an American trailerable sailboat that was designed by William E. Cook as a one-design racer and day sailer, It was first built in 1986.

Production
The design was initially built by Impulse Marine in the United States. After the first 10-12 boats were completed, it was then built under contract by Johnson Boatworks on behalf of Impulse Marine. A total of 150 boats were completed, but it is now out of production.

Design
The Impulse 21 is a recreational keelboat, built predominantly of fiberglass, with a Klegecell core. It has a fractional sloop rig, a raked stem, a cut-out, walk-through, sharply reverse transom that allows ease of boarding, an internally mounted spade-type rudder controlled by a tiller and a fixed fin keel. It displaces  and carries  of ballast.

The design has only a small cuddy cabin for sail and cooler stowage and no sleeping accommodation.

The boat is equipped with foam-fill compartments for buoyancy.

The design has a Portsmouth Yardstick D-PN racing average handicap of 183.

Operational history
In a 1994 review Richard Sherwood wrote, "a day sailer with room for lots of crew, the Impulse’s most unusual feature is a center console housing the control lines for the jib sheet, jib traveler, jib Cunningham, main Cunningham, boom vang, spinnaker halyard, spinnaker retriever, and backstay adjustments. The cockpit is 9 feet long, with seating on the wide decks ... Keel depth is moderate, so that Impulse may be trailered. However, the keel, taken with the wide beam and deck, provides good stability, and foam-filled compartments provide flotation."

See also
List of sailing boat types
Impulse (dinghy), another sailboat design with the same name.

References

Keelboats
1980s sailboat type designs
Sailing yachts
Trailer sailers
Sailboat type designs by William E. Cook
Sailboat types built by Impulse Marine
Sailboat types built by Johnson Boat Works